The Constitution of Lebanon was adopted on 23 May 1926. Article 11, on the Official National Language, declares that 
"Arabic is the official national language. A law determines the cases in which the French language may be used."

The most recent amendment of the Constitution was for the Charter of Lebanese National Reconciliation (Ta'if Accord), in October, 1989.

In an attempt to maintain equality between Christians and Muslims, Article 24 of the constitution mandates the distribution of offices on the basis of Confessionalism as an interim measure, but does not specify how they are to be allocated. (See National Pact.)  It does, nevertheless, specify that half the seats shall be given to Christians and half to Muslims.  Article 24 in its entirety reads as follows.

The constitution describes the flag of Lebanon. The original version of Article 5 read "The Lebanese flag is blue, white, red with a cedar in the white part". A change made on 7 December 1943 indicated that "The Lebanese flag is made of red, white and red horizontal stripes, with the cedar in green in the centre of the white stripe". Some flag manufacturers have created a more conventional looking tree, with a brown trunk. Some allege that this is unconstitutional.

A scholarly reference book on the Lebanese Constitution, describing its history and citing its full text as well as all its amendments was  published in 1968 by Shafik Jiha and Wadih Chbat.

See also 

Driving licence in Lebanon
History of Lebanon
Lebanese diaspora
Lebanese identity card
Lebanese nationality law
Lebanese passport
Politics of Lebanon
Vehicle registration plates of Lebanon
Visa policy of Lebanon
Visa requirements for Lebanese citizens

References

External links 

 1930 French version of the Constitution of Lebanon in:  

1926 in Lebanon
Government of Lebanon
Lebanon
Law of Lebanon
Politics of Lebanon